Crustacyanin is a carotenoprotein biological pigment found in the exoskeleton of lobsters and responsible for their blue colour.  β-Crustacyanin (β-CR), is composed of two stacked astaxanthin carotenoids that absorb at λ = 580–590 nm (2.10–2.14 eV). α-crustacyanin (α-CR) is an assembly of eight β-CR protein dimers.  It is a 320 kDa (atomic mass) complex containing 16 astaxanthin molecules.  Although the β-CR dimer has a peak wavelength of 580 nm, α-CR exhibits a bathochromic shift to 632 nm; the mechanism and function of the additional wavelength shift is not understood.

References

Biological pigments